Electorate may refer to:
 The people who are eligible to vote in an election, especially their number e.g. the term size of (the) electorate
 The dominion of a Prince-elector in the Holy Roman Empire until 1806
 An electoral district or constituency, the geographic area of a particular election

See also
 
 Elector (disambiguation)